Dead Presidents is the first of two soundtracks to the 1995 film, Dead Presidents. It was released on September 26, 1995, by Capitol Records and consists of 1970s R&B, funk and soul music. The soundtrack was very successful, reaching #14 on the Billboard 200 and #1 on the Top R&B/Hip-Hop Albums charts, and was certified gold on December 1, 1995. The soundtrack's success led Capitol Records to release a second volume the following year.

Track listing

Notes
"Dead Presidents Theme" composed and conducted by Danny Elfman.

Personnel and credits
Executive-Producer, Album Producer – Albert Hughes, Allen Hughes, Darryl Porter
Executive-Producer, Co-Executive Album Producer – Bonnie Greenberg
Lacquer Cut – Wally
Mastered – Wally Traugott

Charts

Weekly charts

Year-end charts

Certifications

See also 
 List of number-one R&B albums of 1995 (U.S.)

References 

Thriller film soundtracks
1995 soundtrack albums
Capitol Records soundtracks